Eucalyptus absita, commonly known as the Badgingarra box, is a mallee that is endemic to a small area near Badgingarra in Western Australia. It has smooth gray bark, sometimes fibrous near its base, white flowers and conical to cup-shaped fruit.

Description
The flowers are borne in groups of up to seven in leaf axils. The stamens are white, curve inwards and the outer ones lack anthers.

Taxonomy and naming
Eucalyptus absita was first formally described in 1992 by Peter Grayling and Ian Brooker who published the description in the journal Nuytsia from specimens collected by Brooker south east of Badgingarra in 1986. The specific epithet (absita) is derived from the Latin word abitus meaning "departure" or "exit", referring to the remoteness of this species compared to the similar "box" trees of eastern Australia. The letter 's' was added without explanation.

Eucalyptus absita has been assigned to section Adnataria (boxes), allied to Eucalyptus subgenus Symphyomyrtus. Within the Adnataria section, E. absita is part of a subgroup, series Buxeales which are all found in south-eastern Australia, with only three occurring in Western Australia, those being Eucalyptus cuprea, Eucalyptus absita and Eucalyptus lucasii. All three have inflexed stamens which separates them from the eastern species.

The species is recognised as hybridising with sister taxon Eucalyptus loxophleba, the York Gum.<ref>{{APNI | name = Eucalyptus loxophleba Benth.| id = 23601}}</ref>

Distribution and habitat
Badgingarra box is only known from three small stands on a roadside and in paddocks grazed by livestock, one stand containing a single tree. The species is only known to occur between Badgingarra and Dandaragan.

Conservation
This eucalypt has been classified as "endangered" under the Australian Government Environment Protection and Biodiversity Conservation Act 1999'' and as "Threatened Flora (Declared Rare Flora — Extant)" by the Department of Environment and Conservation (Western Australia) and a Recovery Plan has been prepared. The main threats to the species are road maintenance, lack of associated vegetation, weed invasion, damage by livestock and lack of opportunities for reproduction.

See also
List of Eucalyptus species

References

absita
Eucalypts of Western Australia
Trees of Australia
Myrtales of Australia
Plants described in 1992
Taxa named by Ian Brooker